Donnacha is an Irish given name; a variant of Donnchadh. Notable people with the name include:

 Donnacha Cody (born 1985), Irish hurler for the Kilkenny senior team
 Donnacha Dennehy (born 1970), Irish composer
 Donnacha Fahy (born 1979), Irish hurler for Tipperary GAA
 Donnacha O'Brien (born 1998), Irish jockey
 Donnacha O'Dea (born 1948), Irish professional poker player and swimmer
 Donnacha Ryan (born 1983), Irish rugby union player
 Donnacha Costello, Irish composer

Irish-language masculine given names